Muhammad Nazir (born 20 August 1930) is a Pakistani wrestler. He competed in the men's freestyle heavyweight at the 1960 Summer Olympics.

References

External links
 

1930 births
Possibly living people
Pakistani male sport wrestlers
Olympic wrestlers of Pakistan
Wrestlers at the 1960 Summer Olympics
Sportspeople from Lahore
Asian Games medalists in wrestling
Wrestlers at the 1958 Asian Games
Asian Games silver medalists for Pakistan
Medalists at the 1958 Asian Games
20th-century Pakistani people